The Crossings is a census-designated place (CDP) and suburb of Miami in Miami-Dade County, Florida, United States. The population was 23,276 at the 2020 census. The CDP includes the neighborhoods of The Crossings, Devon Aire and Calusa.

Geography
The CDP is bordered on the north by Kendall Drive (SW 88th Street), on the south by SW 120th Street, by Florida's Turnpike on the east, and SW 137th Avenue on the west. Neighboring census-designated places are Kendale Lakes to the north, Kendall to the east, Three Lakes to the south, and The Hammocks to the west.

History
The communities comprising the CDP were developed in the 1970s and 1980s. The area today is made up of single-family residences and townhouses.

Schools
Calusa Elementary (K-5) and Devon Aire K-8 Center serve the community, as well as Arvida Middle school and Miami Killian Senior High.

Demographics

2020 census

As of the 2020 United States census, there were 23,276 people, 7,485 households, and 5,691 families residing in the CDP.

2010 census
As of the census of 2010, there were 22,758 people and 8,025 households residing in the CDP.

The racial makeup of the CDP was 88.0% White (22.4% were Non-Hispanic White,) 4.7% African American, 0.1% Native American, 2.5% Asian, and 2.4% from two or more races. Hispanic or Latino of any race were 69.4% of the population. Persons of Cuban descent were the largest Hispanic or Latino group, making up 31.0% of the population. Persons born outside of the United States made up 44.7% of the population.

There were 8,025 households, out of which 40.7% had children under the age of 18 living with them, 56.1% were married couples living together, 15.8% had a female householder with no husband present, and 24.3% were non-families. 19.3% of all households were made up of individuals, and 4.0% had someone living alone who was 65 years of age or older. The average household size was 2.98 and the average family size was 3.28.

In the CDP, the population was spread out, with 25.9% under the age of 18, 9.1% from 18 to 24, 32.0% from 25 to 44, 24.6% from 45 to 64, and 8.4% who were 65 years of age or older. The median age was 36 years. For every 100 females, there were 87.9 males. For every 100 females age 18 and over, there were 82.3 males.

The median income for a household in the CDP was $64,380. The per capita income for the CDP was $29,582. About 11.3% of the population was below the poverty line. 40.2% of the population had at least a bachelor's degree.

As of 2012, speakers of Spanish as a first language accounted for 66.2% of residents, and English made up 28.0%, Portuguese was at 1.65%, French was at 0.91%, Persian at 0.72%, French Creole was the main language of 0.71% of the population. 23.3% of the population spoke English less than "very well."

References 

Census-designated places in Miami-Dade County, Florida
Census-designated places in Florida